Euphaedra delera, the brown Ceres forester, is a butterfly in the family Nymphalidae. It is found in central Ivory Coast. The habitat consists of forests.

The larvae feed on Sorindeia warneckei.

References

Butterflies described in 1989
delera
Endemic fauna of Ivory Coast
Butterflies of Africa